Satara district (Marathi pronunciation: [saːt̪aɾaː]) is a district of Maharashtra state in western India with an area of  and a population of 3,003,741 of which 14.17% were urban. Satara is the capital of the district and other major towns include Medha, Wai, Karad, Koregaon, Rahimatpur, Dahiwadi, Koynanagar, Phaltan, Lonand, Mahabaleshwar, Panchgani, Vaduj and Mhaswad. This district comes under Pune Administrative Division along with Pune, Sangli, Solapur and Kolhapur. The district of Pune bounds it to the north, Raigad bounds it to the north-west, Solapur the east, Sangli to the south, and Ratnagiri to the west.

The Sahyadri range, or main range of the Western Ghats, runs north and south along the western edge of the district, separating it from Ratnagiri District. The Mahadeo range starts about 10 m. north of Mahabaleshwar and stretches east and south-east across the whole of the district. The Mahadeo hills are bold, presenting bare scarps of black rock like fortresses. The Satara district is part of two main watersheds. The Bhima River watershed, which is a tributary of the Krishna, includes the north and northeast of the district, north of the Mahadeo hills. The rest of the district is drained by the upper Krishna and its tributaries. The hill forests have a large store of timber and firewood. The whole of Satara district falls within the Deccan Traps area; the hills consist of trap intersected by strata of basalt and topped with laterite, while, of the different soils on the plains, the commonest is the black loamy clay containing carbonate of lime. This soil, when well watered, is capable of yielding heavy crops. Satara contains some important irrigation works, including the Krishna canal.

The Mandher Devi temple in Mandhradevi, near Wai, is the Kalubai temple. Devotees attribute miraculous properties to a grove around the shrine. Lore has it that the temple is more than 400 years old and was built during Shivaji's rule. However, no definite date on the temple's construction is available. It was the scene of a tragic stampede on 25 January 2005.

Officer

Members of Parliament

Shriniwas Patil (NCP)  (Satara)
Ranjit Naik-Nimbalkar (BJP)  (Madha)

Guardian Minister

list of Guardian Minister

District Magistrate/Collector

list of District Magistrate / Collector

History

Historical inscriptions as old as 200 BCE indicate the oldest known place in Satara district in Maharashtra is Karad (mentioned as Karhakada). It is also believed that the Pandavas stayed in Wai, then known as 'Viratnagari', in the 13th year of exile.

Satara District can be proud of the oldest Rashtrakuta history. The oldest Rashtrakutas are believed to be from ancient Kuntala in the valley of river Krishna. Manank ruled from 350 to 375 C.E. and had built his capital in "Manapura" (now Maan in Satara district). The Vakatakas of Vidarbha, were in conflict with Mananka. Subsequently, after fall of the Vakatakas, the Rashtrakutas became feudatories to the Chalukyas and came into prominence under Dantidurga around 753 CE.
 
The empire of Chandragupta II, known as Mahendraditya Kumargupta I, extended as far as Satara district in Deccan when he ruled between 451 AD to 455 AD. The Mauryan empire in the Deccan was followed by the rule of the "Satvahanas" for about two centuries between 550 A.D. to 750 AD.

The first Muslim invasion of the Deccan took place in 1296. In 1636, the Nizam Shahi dynasty came to an end. In 1663 Maratha Chatrapati Shivaji Maharaj conquered Parali and won Satara fort. After the death of Shivaji, Aurangzeb conquered Satara fort, later won by Parshuram Pratinidhi in 1706. In 1708, Chattrapati Shahu was crowned within the Satara fort. The direct descendants of Chatrapati Shivaji Maharaj, continue to live in Satara.

After their victory in the Third Anglo-Maratha War in 1818, the British Empire annexed most of the Maratha territory to Bombay Presidency, but restored the titular Raja Pratap Singh, and assigned to him the principality of Satara, an area much larger than the present district. As a result of political intrigues, Pratap Singh was deposed in 1839, and his brother Raja Shahaji was placed on the throne. When this prince died without a male heir in 1848, Satara was annexed by the British government and added to Bombay Presidency. The Satara Parallel government in Maharashtra from August 1943 to May 1946 opposed British rule, which was effectively overthrown in large parts of Satara district (now separated into Satara and Sangli districts) of Western Maharashtra.

Divisions
Satara district consists of four subdivisions namely Satara, Wai, Karad and Phaltan, divided into eleven talukas (tahsils). These are Satara, Karad, Wai, Mahabaleshwar, Phaltan, Man, Khatav, Koregaon, Patan, Jaoli and Khandala. There are eight Vidhan Sabha constituencies in this district. Karad North, Karad South, Patan, Koregaon, Wai and Satara are part of Satara (Lok Sabha constituency) and Phaltan, Man are part of Madha (Lok Sabha constituency).

Later, in the year 2009, the Karad (Lok Sabha constituency) was cancelled and it fused in the Satara (Lok Sabha constituency) . A new Madha (Lok Sabha constituency) was formed in the same year. Jaoli and Khatav Vidhan Sabha constituencies were cancelled, and Man, Phaltan were added to Madha (Lok Sabha constituency).

Demographics

According to the 2011 census Satara district has a population of 3,003,741, roughly equal to the nation of Albania or the US state of Mississippi. This gives it a ranking of 122nd in India (out of a total of 640). Its population growth rate over the decade 2001–2011 was 6.93%. Satara has a sex ratio of 988 females for every 1000 males, and a literacy rate of 82.87%. Scheduled Castes and Scheduled Tribes made up 10.76% and 0.99% of the population respectively.

Language

At the time of the 2011 census, 95.05% of the population spoke Marathi, 3.60% Hindi and 0.90% Urdu as their first language.

Education
The Sainik School in Satara is one of the oldest residential school preparing boys for military career. The boys are prepared for NDA (National Defence Academy) UPSC examination, and also for technical entries of Army Navy And The Airforce. Ex Chief of the Air Staff, Air Chief Marshal Pradeep Vasant Naik is an alumnus of this institution, amongst many officers serving or served in Indian Armed Forces. This is the First Sainik School established in India and comes under Ministry of Defence.

Government of Maharashtra has started Government Medical College in Satara in 2021. Every year, the college admits 100 students to the undergraduate (MBBS) course via NEET. 15% AIQ quota is there for All India students and 85% is the state quota. 

Krantisinh Nana Patil College of Veterinary Science, Shirwal is affiliated with Maharashtra Animal and Fishery Sciences University.

There are also institutes run by the Rayat Shikshan Sanstha. Karmaveer Bhaurao Patil College Of Engineering and Polytechnic is run by Rayat Shikshan Sanstha and is one of the oldest and reputed engineering colleges in Satara.

In primary education SEMS, Mona School Satara, Nirmala Convent, KSD Shanbhag Vidyalaya, Chhatrapati Shahu Academy, Narmada are some of the best and oldest English Medium schools which are affiliated to Maharashtra state board while the Podar International School is the most excellent school which is affiliated to Central Board Of Secondary Education. Amongst Marathi medium schools, Rayat Shikshan sansthas Anna Saheb Kalyani Vidyalaya, Maharaja Sayajirao Vidyalaya along with Anant English School, and New English School are the best educational institutes in the city.

Villages
 

Andrud
Pachwad
Tambave

Further reading
Malik, S.C. Stone Age Industries of the Bombay & Satara Districts, M. Sayajirao University Baroda 1959.
Selections from the Historical Records of the Hereditary Minister of Baroda. Consisting of letters from Bombay, Baroda, Poona and Satara Governments. Collected by B.A. Gupte. Calcutta 1922.

References

External links

 
Satara District Main Roads and Railways

 
Districts of Maharashtra
Pune division